Callowhill is one of the unofficial names for a neighborhood in Philadelphia, Pennsylvania, located roughly in the vicinity of Callowhill Street, between Vine Street, Spring Garden Street, Broad Street, and 8th Street. The name "Callowhill" was coined by the Callowhill Neighborhood Association, a community organization in the area; although this name often appears on online maps, the City of Philadelphia does not have an official name for this area. Callowhill is named for Callowhill Street, which was named after Hannah Callowhill Penn, William Penn's second wife.  

Callowhill was formerly home to large-scale manufacturing and other industries, of which an architectural history has been left in the form of grand old abandoned factories. During the 1970s and 1980s, the population of Callowhill plummeted, and although numbers are rising, it is a fairly unpopulated section of the city compared to surrounding neighborhoods. Recently developers have started to employ adaptive reuse projects, converting them into loft style housing; so much so that many have termed the neighborhood "The Loft District". In 2010 the Callowhill Industrial Historic District was added to the National Register of Historic Places.

Callowhill is physically cut off from its neighbor to the south, Chinatown, by the Vine Street Expressway. This has largely prevented Chinese businesses from spreading north, although some industrial and storage uses by the Chinese community have been placed in Callowhill. Vine Street is also blamed for the abrupt drop in pedestrian life above Chinatown, and the struggle faced by efforts to redevelop this section of the city that lies between Center City and North Philadelphia.

The former Reading Railroad train trestle, the Reading Viaduct, is a defining feature of the Callowhill neighborhood. Neighborhood groups have proposed that the abandoned structure be maintained as a public park. The Reading Viaduct park plan gained momentum in 2009 when Philadelphia's Center City District (CCD), and its influential president Paul Levy, became enamored of the idea and ultimately became a partner to help manage the project. CCD announced on Tuesday, February 6, 2018 that the first phase of the quarter-mile-long, elevated park would open in spring 2018. The actual grand opening of The Rail park was held on June 14, 2018, attracting a large crowd.

Philadelphia Traffic Court is in Callowhill, at Spring Garden Street and North 8th Street.

See also
National Register of Historic Places listings in Center City, Philadelphia

References

External links
Callowhill Neighborhood Association
9th and Callowhill Redevelopment Area, City Planning Commission, 2005

 
Neighborhoods in Philadelphia
Adaptive reuse of industrial structures in the United States